In molecular biology, the (ADP-ribosyl)hydrolase (ARH) family contains enzymes which catalyses the hydrolysis of ADP-ribosyl modifications from proteins, nucleic acids and small molecules.

Types 
This family has three members in humans (ARH1-3): ARH1, also termed [Protein ADP-ribosylarginine] hydrolase, cleaves ADP-ribose-L-arginine, ARH2, which is predicted to be enzymatically inactive, and ARH3, which cleaves primarily ADP-ribose-L-serine, but was shown to also hydrolyse poly(ADP-ribose), 1''-O-acetyl-ADP-ribose and alpha-nicotinamide adenine dinucleotide. The family also includes ADP-ribosyl-(dinitrogen reductase) hydrolase (DraG) known to regulate dinitrogenase reductase, a key enzyme of the nitrogen fixating pathway in bacteria, and most surprisingly jellyfish crystallins, although the latter proteins appear to have lost the presumed active site residues.

See also 
ADP-ribosylhydrolase 1
ADP-ribosyl-(dinitrogen reductase) hydrolase

References 

Protein families